Kfar Kedem is a tourist center in Israel which reconstructs the everyday life in the Galilee 2000 years ago, during the Mishnah period. Kfar Kedem is located on Route 77, next to the Hamovil intersection. It was established in 1992 in the Hoshaya settlement by Menachem Goldberg. The center includes about 4 acres of vegetation and trees native to the ancient Land of Israel.

The site reconstructs Jewish life in the Galilee during the Mishnah period. It is located next to Sepphoris, which was the home base of the Sanhedrin (the highest Jewish religious court), its scholars [rabbis], and their leader, Judah the Prince, one of the compilers of the Mishnah.

The site opened in 1992. All visitors start the tour with a short lecture, and immediately afterwards they don Tzitzit, a 4-cornered shawl and a scarf to cover their heads.

Attractions
The "Bread Basket": The visitors have the opportunity here to sow seed and work in the wheat fields, grind the harvest by stone, and bake Pita Bread on the walls of a traditional oven of the type used in ancient times.
The "Oil Press": During the winter, visitors take part in picking olives, grinding them, and producing oil using ancient olive press.
The "Greener Pastures": The visitors can shear sheep and spin thread from the wool, as well as milk goats and make goat cheese. 
The "Nomad's Tent": Visitors are hosted in the Nomad's Tent, made from goats’ wool, where they listen to explanations about the nomadic lifestyles of this region during different time periods, learn about the home hospitality that was practiced, and drink herbal tea or bitter coffee.
The "Wine Press": During the summer, visitors experience the grape harvest, press grapes in the ancient wine press, and produce grape juice.
The "Donkey Trail": Visitors ride on donkeys to the nearby woods or along the trails of the village.
The "Homing pigeon": Upon completing these activities, the visitors take a carrier pigeon to the next station, attach a paper note with their personal message to its leg, and release the pigeon.

External links
 Official Website

Parks in Israel
Tourist attractions in Israel
Open-air museums
Tourist attractions in Northern District (Israel)
Tourism in Israel
1992 establishments in Israel
Living museums
Outdoor structures in Israel